Aulonemia pumila is a species of the bamboo genus Aulonemia. 
It is part of the grass family and endemic to Latin America.

References

pumila